Urakəran (also, Uragaran and Urakeran) is a village and municipality in the Yardymli Rayon of Azerbaijan.  It has a population of 962. The municipality consists of the villages of Urakəran and Avun.

References 

Populated places in Yardimli District